Todd Perry (born 17 March, 1976) is an Australian former professional tennis player. In 2022, he launched his debut book One Chance.

Ascending the ranks and going professional in 1998, Perry competed on the ATP tour as both a singles and doubles player, achieving notable success in his doubles career. 

His 13 year professional career saw him play against some of the best in the world, including defeating titans like Nadal and Djokovic and winning six ATP Tour Doubles Titles. 

Perry achieved a career-high doubles ranking of World No. 16 in May 2006, partnering primarily with Swedish doubles player Simon Aspelin. 

Retiring following the 2008 season, Perry returned to his home town of Adelaide and established the Todd Perry Tennis Academy, acting as director and head coach. His success as a player and coach inspired him to share his unique coaching method and approach to sporting psychology, in his new book, One Chance. Todd believes that with the right management, we can work together to keep kids playing the game, and set them on the path to ultimate success.

Career finals

Doubles 17 (6 titles, 11 runner-ups)

References

External links
 
 

Australian male tennis players
Tennis players from Adelaide
1976 births
Living people
Doping cases in tennis
20th-century Australian people